Salsky District is an administrative and municipal district (raion), one of the forty-three in Rostov Oblast, Russia. It is located in the south of the oblast. Its administrative center is the town of Salsk. Population: 107,795 (2010 Census);  The population of Salsk accounts for 56.9% of the district's total population.

Notable residents 

Feofan Parkhomenko (1893–1962), Soviet Army lieutenant general, born in the village of Yekaterinovka
Stepan Rybalchenko (1903–1986), Soviet military officer, born in the settlement of Novoyegorylskoye

References

Notes

Sources

Districts of Rostov Oblast Salsky (Salskj) Region (Region) was taken by Germany on 31 07 1942.